Barbar can refer to:
 Barbar, Bahrain, a village in the north of Bahrain
 Barbar (beer), a beer made by the Lefebvre Brewery
Mustafa Agha Barbar, a governor of the Ottoman provinces of Tripoli, Lebanon and Latakia, Syria for the Ottomans from 1800 to 1835
 Babur, founder of the Mughal Empire
 Berber, Sudan, also spelled Barbar
 Mount Pieter Botte, a mountain in Far North Queensland, Australia

See also
Babar (disambiguation)
Berber (disambiguation)